Syed Aminul Haque is a Pakistani politician who has been a member of the National Assembly of Pakistan since August 2018. Currently serving as Federal Minister of Information Technology and Telecommunication after resignation of MQM(P) Chief Khalid Maqbool Siddiqui.

He served twice in National Assembly before winning the general election of 2018. He is the part of Muttahida Qaumi Movement Pakistan (MQM-P) Party and a member of Rabta Committee of MQM Pakistan.

Political career
He was elected to the National Assembly of Pakistan from constituency NA-251 (Karachi West-IV) as a candidate of Muttahida Qaumi Movement in 2018 Pakistani general election. On 6 April 2020 he was appointed as Federal Minister for Telecommunications.

Amin-ul-Haque was elected 2 times as an MNA before general elections of 2018. He was first elected as a member of the national assembly on 16 November 1988 from NA-194 (Karachi East lll). He was then elected in 1990 from the same constituency.

External Link

More Reading
 List of members of the 15th National Assembly of Pakistan
 List of Pakistan Tehreek-e-Insaf elected members (2013–2018)
 No-confidence motion against Imran Khan

References

Living people
Pakistani MNAs 2018–2023
Federal ministers of Pakistan
1962 births